The Panzerkampfwagen VII Löwe (Lion) was a design for a super-heavy tank created by Krupp for the German government during World War II. The project, initially code-named VK 70.01 (K), never left the drawing board, and was dropped on 5–6 March 1942, in favor of Porsche's heavier Panzer VIII Maus.

Variants 
The Löwe was designed in two variants, unofficially designated Leichter Löwe (light lion) and Schwerer Löwe (heavy lion), both with a crew of five:
It was later cancelled by Adolf Hitler.

See also 
 Panther tank, medium tank 
Tiger I, a vehicle that it was designed to replace
 Tiger II, comparable vehicle, actual successor of Tiger I
 Maus, a further continuation of the super heavy program
 P. 1000 Ratte, a design for a German super-heavy tank
 P. 1500 Monster, proposed German super-heavy self-propelled gun

Tanks of comparable role, performance and era
 Soviet IS-3
 American M103
 British Conqueror
 French AMX-50
 German Panzer VIII Maus

References

Sources
 
 

Super-heavy tanks
World War II tanks of Germany
Tanks introduced in 1941